Asketria is a genus of moths belonging to the subfamily Olethreutinae of the family Tortricidae.

Species
Asketria cervinana (Caradja, 1916)
Asketria lepta Falkovitsh, 1964

See also
List of Tortricidae genera

References

External links
tortricidae.com

Eucosmini
Tortricidae genera